Parliamentary elections were held in Bulgaria on 21 June 1931. The result was a victory for the Popular Bloc, an alliance of the Bulgarian Agrarian National Union (Dragiev), the Democratic Party, the National Liberal Party (Petrov) and the Radical Democratic Party, which won 151 of the 273 seats. Voter turnout was 85.2%.

This would be the last officially partisan election held in Bulgaria before World War II (the 1939 elections were officially nonpartisan, but candidates representing parties ran as individuals).  By the time of the next elections in which parties were formally allowed to take part, in 1945, the country had been through two dictatorships and a third, Communist one was rapidly consolidating.  As a result, the 1931 election was also the last free election held in the country until 1990.

Results

References

Bulgaria
Parliamentary election
Parliamentary elections in Bulgaria
June 1931 events
1931 elections in Bulgaria